The BJW Junior Heavyweight Championship was a title defended in the Japanese professional wrestling promotion Big Japan Pro Wrestling (BJW). It was in use from 1998 through at least November 2002.

On May 7, 2017, BJW announced that it was bringing back the BJW Junior Heavyweight Championship with a tournament set to take place between May 25 and July 17. Although the new title shares its name with the title retired in 2002, the winner of the tournament is considered the first BJW Junior Heavyweight Champion. Wrestlers over the weight limit will be eligible to challenge for the BJW World Strong Heavyweight Championship.

Inaugural tournament
An eight-man knockout tournament was held on March 2, 1998 to crown the inaugural Junior Heavyweight Champion.

Title history

Combined reigns

Footnotes

See also

BJW Junior Heavyweight Championship (2017–present)

References

External links
Title history at Wrestling-Titles.com

Big Japan Pro Wrestling championships
Junior heavyweight wrestling championships